Gnojno may refer to the following places:
Gnojno, Inowrocław County in Kuyavian-Pomeranian Voivodeship (north-central Poland)
Gnojno, Lipno County in Kuyavian-Pomeranian Voivodeship (north-central Poland)
Gnojno, Lublin Voivodeship (east Poland)
Gnojno, Łódź Voivodeship (central Poland)
Gnojno, Świętokrzyskie Voivodeship (south-central Poland)
Gnojno, Masovian Voivodeship (east-central Poland)
Gnojno, Warmian-Masurian Voivodeship (north Poland)